The 2017 NCAA Division I Indoor Track and Field Championships was the 53rd NCAA Men's Division I Indoor Track and Field Championships and the 36th NCAA Women's Division I Indoor Track and Field Championships, held at the Gilliam Indoor Track Stadium in College Station, Texas near the campus of the host school, the Texas A&M University. In total, thirty-four different men's and women's indoor track and field events were contested from March 10 to March 11, 2017.

Results

Men's results

60 meters
Final results shown, not prelims

200 meters
Final results shown, not prelims

400 meters
Final results shown, not prelims

800 meters
Final results shown, not prelims

Mile
Final results shown, not prelims

3000 meters

5000 meters

60 meters hurdles
Final results shown, not prelims

4 × 400 meters relay

Distance medley relay

High jump

Pole vault

Long jump

Triple jump

Shot put

Weight throw

Heptathlon

Men's team scores
Top 10 and ties shown

Women's results

w60 meters
Final results shown, not prelims

w200 meters
Final results shown, not prelims

w400 meters
Final results shown, not prelims

w800 meters
Final results shown, not prelims

wMile
Final results shown, not prelims

w3000 meters

w5000 meters

w60 meters hurdles
Final results shown, not prelims

w4 × 400 meters relay

wDistance medley relay

wHigh jump

wPole vault

wLong jump

wTriple jump

wShot put

wWeight throw

wPentathlon

Women's team scores
Top 10 and ties shown

See also
 NCAA Men's Division I Indoor Track and Field Championships 
 NCAA Women's Division I Indoor Track and Field Championships

References

NCAA Indoor Track and Field Championships
NCAA Division I Indoor Track and Field Championships
NCAA Division I Indoor Track and Field Championships
NCAA Division I Indoor Track and Field Championships
NCAA Division I Indoor Track and Field Championships